Functional magnetic resonance imaging adaptation (FMRIa) is a method of functional magnetic resonance imaging that reads the brain changes occurring in response to long exposure to evocative stimulus. If Stimulus 1 (S1) excites a certain neuronal population, repeated exposure to S1 will result in subsequently attenuated responses. This adaptation may be due to neural fatigue or coupled hemodynamic processes. However, when S1 is followed by a unique stimulus, S2, the response amplitudes should not be attenuated as a fresh sub-population of neurons is excited. Using this technique can allow researchers to determine if the same or unique neuronal groups are involved in processing two stimuli.

Usage
This technique has been used successfully in examination of the visual system, particularly orientation, motion, and face recognition.

See also
 Adaptive system
 Functional magnetic resonance imaging
 Neural adaptation

References

Magnetic resonance imaging